Sir Robert Heath (1575–1649) was Attorney-General under King Charles I.

Robert Heath may also refer to:

Robert W. Heath Jr. (born 1973), American electrical engineer and professor
Robert Heath (MP) (1816–1893), British Conservative Party politician
Robert Heath (mathematician) (died 1779), British army officer and periodical editor
Robert Galbraith Heath (1915–1999), psychiatrist
Robert Heath (footballer) (born 1978), English footballer who played for Stoke City

See also
Robert Heath & Sons Ltd., former coal and iron masters in Staffordshire, England, see Foxfield Railway
Robert Hethe (died 1396), MP for Ipswich